Edward Aloysius "Scrap Iron" Kenna (September 30, 1897 - August 21, 1972) was a Major League Baseball catcher. He played part of one season, for the Washington Senators. That season, he served as the primary backup to starting catcher Muddy Ruel, playing in 33 games at that position.

Kenna's minor league baseball career spanned 17 years. In , Kenna's last year as a player, he served as player-manager of the Portsmouth Pirates of the Middle Atlantic League.

Sources

1897 births
1972 deaths
Albany Senators players
Baltimore Orioles (IL) players
Baseball players from San Francisco
Chattanooga Lookouts players
Cincinnati Reds scouts
Des Moines Demons players
Edmonton Eskimos (baseball) players
Hartford Senators players
Hollywood Stars players
Lewiston Broncs players
Major League Baseball catchers
Minneapolis Millers (baseball) players
Nashville Vols players
Oakland Oaks (baseball) players
Portsmouth Pirates players
San Francisco Seals (baseball) players
Vernon Tigers players
Washington Senators (1901–1960) players
Ogden (minor league baseball) players